Choreutis dichlora is a moth in the family Choreutidae. It was described by Edward Meyrick in 1912. It is found in India and China.

References

Choreutis
Moths described in 1912
Taxa named by Edward Meyrick